The Suva, headquartered in Lucerne, is the Swiss National Accident Insurance Fund. It is a public-sector insurer and leading provider of health care coverage for employees in case of accidents in Switzerland.

Name 

The name is the abbreviation of Schweizerische Unfallversicherungsanstalt (German for Swiss National Accident Insurance Fund, in French Caisse nationale suisse d'assurance en cas d'accidents or CNA; in Italian Istituto nazionale svizzero di assicurazione contro gli infortuni).

History 

It was founded 1912 and its active since 1918. For a long time, it held a monopoly for compulsory coverage for employees in high-risk professions. Its surplus income is distributed to insureds in the form of premium reductions.

Its three missions are prevention, insurance and rehabilitation. About half of people working in Switzerland are insurance by the Suva in case of accidents (128,000 companies and 2,000,000 people insured).

Unemployed people are insured against accidents by the Suva. Since 2005, the Swiss Armed Forces are also insured against accidents by the Suva.

Notes and references

See also 
 Trauma und Berufskrankheit
Trauma und Berufskrankheit (journal)

External links 

 Official website
 Swiss Institute for Accident Insurance (SUVA) in History of Social Security in Switzerland

Financial services companies established in 1918
Insurance companies of Switzerland